Events from the year 1686 in Ireland.

Incumbent
Monarch: James II

Events
January 9 – Henry Hyde, 2nd Earl of Clarendon, sworn as Lord Lieutenant of Ireland in Dublin.
March 22 – warrant issued by King James II of England for payments to Roman Catholic bishops.
April 6 – Michael Boyle (archbishop of Armagh) is replaced as Lord Chancellor of Ireland (after serving for twenty years) by Sir Charles Porter.
April 20–April 24 – three Roman Catholic judges are appointed to Ireland (but Charles Ingleby refuses to travel there).
June 5–October 26 – the Roman Catholic Richard Talbot, 1st Earl of Tyrconnell, serves in Ireland as commander in chief of the army.
October 26 – the Roman Catholic lawyer and politician Richard Nagle writes the 'Coventry letter' to Tyrconnell attacking land settlement in Ireland.
December – Sir Richard Nagle is appointed Attorney-General for Ireland.

Arts and literature
February – first known music printed in Ireland.
Jonathan Swift is granted his BA from Trinity College Dublin ex speciali gratia.

Births
March 22 – James Hamilton, 7th Earl of Abercorn (d.1744)
December 23 – Samuel Madden, clergyman and writer (d.1765)
 Chaworth Brabazon, 6th Earl of Meath (d.1763)

Deaths
April 6 – Arthur Annesley, 1st Earl of Anglesey, royal statesman (b.1614)

References

 
Years of the 17th century in Ireland
1680s in Ireland
Ireland